The House of Saxe-Coburg and Gotha is a European royal house. It takes its name from its oldest domain, the Ernestine duchy of Saxe-Coburg and Gotha, its members later sat on the thrones of Belgium, Bulgaria, Portugal, India, and the United Kingdom and its dominions.

Founded in 1826 by Ernest Anton, the sixth duke of Saxe-Coburg-Saalfeld, it is a cadet branch of the Saxon House of Wettin. One agnatic branch currently reigns in Belgiumthe descendants of Leopold Iand another reigned until the death of Elizabeth II in the United Kingdomthe descendants of Albert, Prince Consort.

In 1917, the First World War caused the British king George V to officially change the name from "Saxe-Coburg and Gotha" to "Windsor" in the United Kingdom. In Belgium, due to similar resentment against Germany after the Great War, the use of name was also changed in 1920 by King Albert I to "de Belgique" (French), "van België" (Dutch) or "von Belgien" (German), meaning "of Belgium". However, the "Saxe-Coburg" house name of the Belgian royal family was never officially abolished, and since relations between Belgium and Germany have been normalized for a long time, the use of this family name has been slowly reintroduced since the 2010s (especially since King Philippe of Belgium wants to limit the number of princes and princesses of Belgium, and thus the use of the designation "of Belgium", to only a select group of his family).

History

The first duke of Saxe-Coburg and Gotha was Ernest I, who reigned from 1826 until his death in 1844. He had previously been Duke of Saxe-Coburg-Saalfeld (as Ernest III) from 1806 until the duchy was reorganized in 1826.

Ernest's younger brother Leopold became King of the Belgians in 1831, and his descendants continue to serve as Belgian monarchs. Leopold's only daughter, Princess Charlotte of Belgium, was the consort of Maximilian I of Mexico, and she was known as Empress Carlota of Mexico in the 1860s.

Ernest I's second son, Prince Albert (1819–1861), married his first cousin Queen Victoria in 1840 (Victoria's mother was a sister of Ernest I). Prince Albert thus is the progenitor of the United Kingdom's current royal family, called the House of Windsor since 1917.

In 1826, a cadet branch of the house inherited the Hungarian princely estate of the Koháry family and converted to Roman Catholicism. Its members managed to marry a queen regnant of Portugal, an imperial princess of Brazil, an archduchess of Austria, a French royal princess, a royal princess of Belgium and a royal princess of Saxony. A scion of this branch, Ferdinand, became ruling Prince and then Tsar of Bulgaria, and his descendants continued to reign there until 1946. The current head of the House of Bulgaria, the former Tsar Simeon Saxe-Coburg-Gotha, who was deposed and exiled after World War II, goes by the name of Simeon Sakskoburggotski and served as Bulgaria's prime minister from 2001 to 2005.

The ducal house consisted of all male-line descendants of John Ernest IV, Duke of Saxe-Coburg-Saalfeld legitimately born of an equal marriage, males and females (the latter until their marriage), their wives in equal and authorised marriages, and their widows until remarriage. According to the House law of the Duchy of Saxe-Coburg and Gotha, the full title of the Duke was:

There were two official residences, in Gotha and Coburg. Therefore, the whole ducal court, including the court theatre, had to move twice a year: from Gotha to Coburg for the summer and from Coburg to Gotha for the winter.

For the Court Theater, two almost identical buildings had to be built in 1840 in Gotha (destroyed in World War II) and Coburg (now the Coburg State Theater) and thereafter maintained at the same time. In addition to the residential castles, Friedenstein Palace in Gotha and Ehrenburg Palace in Coburg, the ducal family also used the Schloss Reinhardsbrunn in Gotha, as well as the Schloss Rosenau and Callenberg Castle in Coburg, and a hunting lodge, Greinburg Castle, in Grein, Austria.

Branches

Ducal branch

Dukes, 1826–1918
 Ernest I 1826–1844
 Ernest II 1844–1893
 Alfred 1893–1900
 Charles Edward 1900–1918

Heads of the house since 1918
 Charles Edward 1918–1954
 Friedrich Josias 1954–1998
 Andreas 1998–present

Although the ducal branch is eponymous with the dynasty, its head is not the senior member of the family genealogically or agnatically. In 1893, the reigning duke Ernest II died childless, whereupon the throne would have devolved, by male primogeniture, upon the descendants of his brother Prince Albert. However, as heirs to the British throne, Albert's descendants consented and the law of the duchy ratified that the ducal throne would not be inherited by the British monarch or heir apparent. Therefore, the German duchy became a secundogeniture, hereditary among the younger princes of the British royal family who belonged to the House of Wettin, and their male-line descendants.

Instead of Albert Edward, Prince of Wales (the future Edward VII of the United Kingdom) inheriting the duchy, it was diverted to his next brother, Prince Alfred, Duke of Edinburgh. Upon the latter's death without surviving sons, it went to the youngest grandson of Prince Albert and Queen Victoria, Prince Charles Edward, Duke of Albany. Charles Edward's uncle Prince Arthur, Duke of Connaught and his male line had renounced their claim. Although senior by birth, they were either not acceptable to the German Emperor as either a member of the British military or unwilling to move to Germany.

The current head of the ducal branch is Andreas, the grandson of Charles Edward. Since the duchy was abolished in 1918, the heads use the title Prince rather than Duke.

House of Saxe-Coburg and Gotha-Koháry
The House of Saxe-Coburg and Gotha-Koháry is a Catholic cadet branch of the House of Saxe-Coburg and Gotha. It was founded with the marriage of Prince Ferdinand of Saxe-Coburg and Gotha, second son of Francis, Duke of Saxe-Coburg-Saalfeld, with Princess Maria Antonia Koháry de Csábrág. Their second son Prince August inherited the estates of the House of Koháry in Hungary and Austria. August's youngest son became Ferdinand I of Bulgaria.

Kingdom of Portugal

The Portuguese line was founded by Prince Ferdinand's eldest son, Ferdinand the younger, who married Queen Maria II of the House of Braganza and became king himself. It was overthrown in the Revolution of 1910, after which it became extinct in 1932 upon the death of Manuel II. Duarte Nuno of Braganza and his successors were descendants of the banished Miguelist line.
 Pedro V (1853–1861)
 Luís I (1861–1889)
 Carlos I (1889–1908)
 Manuel II (r. 1908–1910, d.1932)

Kingdom of Bulgaria

From the accession of Boris III in 1918 onward, this branch of the family belongs to the Bulgarian Orthodox Church.

 Ferdinand I (1887–1918)
 Boris III (1918–1943)
 Simeon II (1943–1946) In 2001, elected Prime Minister of Bulgaria as Simeon Saxe-Coburg-Gotha—also known as Simeon "Sakskoburggotski" (Сакскобургготски).

Kings of the Belgians

The Belgian line was founded by Leopold, youngest son of Francis, Duke of Saxe-Coburg-Saalfeld. 

 Leopold I (1831–1865)
 Leopold II (1865–1909)
 Albert I (1909–1934)
 Leopold III (1934–1951)
 Baudouin (1951–1993)
 Albert II (1993–2013)
 Philippe (2013–present)

Belgian royal house 
Because of the First World War, the title of the family was unofficially changed in 1920 or 1921 to "of Belgium", and the armorial bearings of Saxony were removed from the Belgian royal coat of arms. Since the 2017 Carnet Mondain, the title "Saxe-Cobourg-Gotha" is again in use for all the descendants of Leopold I, with the exception of King Philippe, his wife, his sister and his brother who keep their title "of Belgium"; therefore the descendants of Astrid of Belgium do not bear this title, but that of "of Austria-Este" of their father. The armorial bearing of Saxony was put back in 2019.

United Kingdom

The British line was founded by King Edward VII, eldest son of Queen Victoria and Prince Albert of Saxe-Coburg and Gotha. His successor and son, King George V, changed the name of this line of the royal house and family to Windsor.
Edward VII (1901–1910)
George V (1910–1917)

Genealogy
Patrilineality, descent as reckoned from father to son, had historically been the principle determining membership in reigning families until late in the 20th century, thus the dynasty to which the monarchs of the House of Saxe-Coburg-Gotha belonged genealogically throughout the 1900s is the House of Wettin, despite the official use of varying names by different branches of the patriline.

References

External links

 Official website of the Ducal House of Saxe-Coburg and Gotha
 Website of Andreas, Prince of Saxe-Coburg and Gotha
 Callenberg Castle website
 European Heraldry page

|-

|-

|-

|-

 
German noble families
House of Wettin
Bulgarian noble families
Royal houses of Britain
Ruling families of the County of Flanders
Ruling families of the Duchy of Brabant
1826 establishments in Germany